The Great Red Dragon paintings are a series of watercolour paintings by the English poet and painter William Blake, painted between 1805 and 1810. It was during this period that Blake was commissioned to create over one hundred paintings intended to illustrate books of the Bible. These paintings depict "The Great Red Dragon" in various scenes from the Book of Revelation.

The paintings

The Great Red Dragon and the Woman Clothed with the Sun (Rev. 12: 1-4)
Height: 43.7 cm, Width: 34.8 cm

Housed at the Brooklyn Museum.

The Great Red Dragon and the Woman Clothed with the Sun
This image is similar to the work with a similar name in the Brooklyn Museum (see above) but the subject is shown from a different viewpoint and the figures are in different positions.
Height: 40.8 cm, Width: 33.7 cm

Housed at the National Gallery of Art, Washington D.C.

The Great Red Dragon and the Beast from the Sea

Height: 40.1 cm, Width: 35.6 cm

Housed at the National Gallery of Art, Washington D.C.

The Number of the Beast is 666
Height: 40.6 cm, Width: 33.0 cm

Housed at: the Rosenbach Museum & Library

In media
It has been used as the Oxford World's Classics front cover of The Private Memoirs and Confessions of a Justified Sinner.

Several of the paintings featured prominently in the 2019 psychological horror film Saint Maud by British director Rose Glass.

The 1981 novel Red Dragon, by author Thomas Harris, heavily features the Blake painting. The primary antagonist is driven by a psychological obsession with the painting, including having the painting tattooed onto his back and the belief that his murders will help him to transform into the Red Dragon. Near the end of the novel, he attempts to break away from his beliefs by going to the Brooklyn Museum and eating the original painting itself. The 2002 film version of the novel includes these elements, and features multiple shots of the painting, as did the NBC prequel series Hannibal.

References

William Blake's mythology
Collections of the National Gallery of Art
1800s paintings
Painting series
Art by William Blake
Paintings based on the Book of Revelation
Satan
Dragons in art
Watercolor paintings